Detective Stella Bonasera is a fictional character and a co-protagonist of the CBS crime drama CSI: NY. Portrayed by Melina Kanakaredes, Stella appeared in six seasons of CSI: NY after which she was replaced by Jo Danville, played by Sela Ward.

Background 
The character of Stella Bonasera is Mac Taylor's second-in-command in the fictional New York Police Department's crime lab of the television show CSI: New York. Throughout various episodes, the writers of the show have revealed that Bonasera began her career working as a patrol officer and once worked Narcotics out of Brooklyn North. She is portrayed as a character with a bold personality and her unflagging determination to solve a crime has earned the character at least four complaints on her record as a result. Her badge number is "8946".

Early life 
Stella is a half-Greek, half-Italian orphan (though she identifies more with her Greek side) who grew up at St. Basil's Orphanage. She left when she was eighteen (episode 115, "Til Death Do We Part"). In the season 5 episode "Grounds for Deception", it is revealed that Stella's mother was a restoration painter from Naousa who brought two-year-old Stella with her when she came to New York with an exhibit. Soon after the exhibit, her mother was killed in a traffic accident. Stella is fluent in Greek and has spoken some Italian on the Can You Hear Me Now episode (Season 4, episode 1). She has briefly read a Cyrillic Russian message in the Blink episode (Season 1, episode 1) and also briefly spoke in Russian with a spray-on pantyhose suspect in the Run Silent, Run Deep episode (Season 2, episode 20). She was in foster care in her early life. It is revealed that a professor, whom Stella was close to, got her out of foster care. Stella is also religious and can be seen crossing herself with holy water in a church (episode 8, "Three Generations Are Enough).

Relationships 
Stella's personal life was the subject of a few episodes in Season Two. A boyfriend named Frankie Mala first appeared in the second episode of Season Two, "Grand Murder at Central Station", and he appeared occasionally throughout the rest of the season. In an episode late in Season Two entitled "All Access", after discovering that Frankie had secretly taped them making love and uploaded the footage to the internet, Stella broke off their relationship. In the same episode, Frankie breaks into her apartment shortly after and takes Stella hostage. Stella manages to free herself and, fearing for her life, is forced to kill Frankie with her service weapon in self-defense. In "Dancing With The Fishes", when examining the case of a dancer who falls from New York's only tram onto a car below, Stella notices the bunions and toe injuries and reveals that she was a student of jazz, tap and ballet, and later demonstrates this knowledge in a short basic sequence of dance steps which leaves both Mac and Flack impressed.

When Drew Bedford wanted to take revenge on Mac for the death of his brother when they were young, he tried to make Stella fall for him to get closer to Mac. This effort turned out to be in vain, because, relying on her gut, Stella told him that she is "not looking for a relationship."  In Season 5, episode 503, "Turbulence", she is seen to be with a firefighter, Brandon Walsh, for a softball practice. Later in episode 515, "The Party's Over", she takes Walsh as her escort to an event.

Stella cares deeply for all the members of her team.  She is very close to Mac Taylor as well as Don Flack and constantly worries about their well-being.  She and Mac have one of the noticeably closest relationships on the show.  Stella acts as his right hand, the most senior member of his team aside from himself.  They are so close that, in preparation for a date with a woman he met in a coffee shop, Mac allows Stella to remove his tie at the end of episode 123 ("What You See Is What You See"). In episode 224 "Charge of this Post", she stays with him at the hospital to watch over the injured Don Flack. Considering how uptight Mac had been during the course of the first season, this can be seen as a very trusting, if not intimate, gesture. In episode 109 "Officer Blue", during which Mac and Stella had one of their most heated fights, he admitted that he "honestly wouldn't do this job" without her, when they reconciled  at the end of episode. Mac was also the only person (other than Adam, the lab rat who ran the test secretly) whom she told about her fear when she was suspected to have HIV, in episode 317 "The Ride-In".

During Season 5, it is revealed that Professor Papakota, a Greek antiquities expert whom Stella regards as a father figure, is involved in stealing antiquities. Stella, against the advice of Mac, returns to the land of her birth to find and track him down. Along with "Officer Blue", "Grounds for Deception" is when Stella has one of her biggest fights with Mac. She later also finds out that the painting in her office – which Papakota had given her upon graduation from the police academy – had actually been stolen by Professor P. After she returns the painting, she finds out about her mother's identity from Mac, who had followed her to Greece.

When Peyton broke up with Mac, Stella went to the club where Mac plays his bass guitar, and exchanged an understanding smile with him. Mac offered his guest room, when Stella's apartment caught in the fire in episode 416 "Right Next Door", to which she declined reasoning that she snores. In episode 516 "No Good Deed", Mac took Stella for a cup of coffee to "fish some advice", when they were interrupted with an eyeball that dropped into Stella's cup. Later, Mac told Stella the trouble he had with Ella McBride, the girl who attempted to kill herself in 511 "Forbidden Fruit". Stella give him his advice back, telling him that he cannot save everyone, to which he said that he "just need to hear it" from her.

Stella is also protective of the rest of her colleagues.  During episode 311, "Raising Shane", a police captain who dislikes character Danny Messer harasses him at a crime scene, calling Danny a felon and hinting that he would have him dismissed.  Stella steps in and tells the captain to stop threatening her team or she'd go after the captain's badge.  After Sheldon Hawkes is cleared of the crime that he was framed for in the same episode, Stella is the first person to greet him when he is released.

Stella has also built a strong friendship with fellow CSI Lindsay Monroe. Stella is hurt when Lindsay refuses to share her troubles in episode 312, "Silent Night", but when Lindsay later comes to her and asks for a friend, Stella responds immediately, "You've got one." When Lindsay must return to Montana to testify in a murder trial, Stella, not Mac, is the one she informs first. Just a few minutes before the trial begins, Lindsay calls her to talk to her and Stella comforts her. Stella also shows a fondness for Lindsay's enthusiastic explanations of evidence and occasional demonstrations, usually with a remark along the lines of "I love it when she does this." She also gave Lindsay a form of assurance that she has good coworkers, who will understand and be happy for her, when in her anxiousness over her pregnancy and getting exposed to chemical substances in the lab, the younger woman asks her about the security procedure for a pregnant friend of her in Jersey. At the end of the conversation, Stella said to Lindsay to tell her friend "congratulations", indicating that she knows that Lindsay is actually the one who was pregnant.  When Lindsay and Danny got married in episode 517, "Green Piece", Stella and Mac were there as witnesses.

Stella is also good friends with Det. Don Flack. They often work cases together and she appreciates his sense of humor. In episode 221, "All Access", Flack is especially gentle with Stella when he comes to take her statement following her hostage ordeal. He tells her she is a friend and she responds that he is a "very good friend." In "Charge of This Post" (episode 224), she takes turns with the other team members staying at Flack's bedside as he recovers from his near-fatal injuries from a bomb blast. It is hinted at that she and Flack have known each other for longer than her time as a CSI. Though, to Flack's surprise, she admitted that she plays Poker while investigating a crime scene at a Poker game on the Bad Beat (season 2, episode 8) episode. On the Risk (season 2, episode 13) episode, Stella reveals her frugality that she puts in her bank account whatever she doesn't spend, while discussing with Flack about the stock market during the investigation of a stockbroker found hanging outside his high rise office window.

Stella is also hinted to have been flirty with Miami-Dade PD Lt. Horatio Caine during the CSI: NY and CSI: Miami crossover episode "Manhattan Manhunt" where they work together to find a notorious killer.

In episode 601 "Epilogue", she has a one night stand with Adam Ross. A few days later, they discuss that it was wonderful, but better left un-repeated.

In the line of duty 
Of the four complaints on her record, two are from felons subsequently imprisoned, one is from a murder suspect released because of an error by an ADA, and the fourth is filed in "Supply and Demand" (episode 120) by the father of a college student suspected of selling drugs that had already killed a fellow student.  The insinuation is that Stella is willing to push a suspect's buttons in an effort to get a confession or information.

Stella does not suffer fools gladly.  During "Open and Shut" (episode 306), she initially expresses sympathy for a woman who appears to be the only survivor of a double homicide in her home. After further investigation reveals that the woman is not the victim but actually the mastermind of the crime, Stella is furious and confronts the woman in the interrogation room. When the woman smugly compares her situation to Stella's with Frankie, Stella counters that their situations were nothing alike: Stella had been a victim who acted out of self-defense, while the woman was a cold-blooded murderer who wanted to escape what she hinted was a bad marriage.

In episode 202, "Grand Murder at Central Station", she is plainly disgusted by the murder suspect's belittling of his blind victim.

In episode 316, "Heart of Glass", Stella accidentally cuts herself on a piece of glass while processing a crime scene, potentially exposing herself to the victim's HIV-positive blood. Though she immediately cleans and bandages the wound, as well as starting an anti-viral regimen, she cannot know for several months whether she has contracted HIV.  The uncertainty has already interfered with her life, as when she refuses to let Hawkes touch her after a suspect smashes the one-way mirror in the interrogation room and Stella is cut on the cheek by a shard of the broken mirror.

Stella's timely arrival in the autopsy room, as well as her administration of epinephrine, is critical in saving the life of coroner Sid Hammerback, who suffers a severe allergic reaction to a sandwich he had eaten earlier.  Later, Stella expresses her concern to Hammerback that she may have exposed him to HIV when she administered CPR, but he is simply grateful to her and happy to be alive (episode 317, "The Ride In").

By episode 320, "What Schemes May Come", she expresses a desire to know once and for all whether or not she is HIV-positive.  Stella asks Mac to requisition the necessary supplies for a PCR DNA test, which will provide faster results than the standard tests.  As the lab already has the facilities required and someone (specifically lab tech Adam Ross) qualified to perform the tests, Mac approves the expense.  Adam later performs the test, and she learns, to her elation, that she is HIV-negative (episode 321, "Past Imperfect").

Stella's blood is accidentally entered into CODIS due to a lab tech error during her PCR DNA test.  Philadelphia Homicide gets a hit for it in a cold case involving some bloody clothes found buried along a highway.  The Cold Case Squad sends out Detective Scotty Valens (played by Danny Pino) to investigate and question Stella's involvement.  Despite his initial threat of handcuffing her, he eventually clears her of culpability in the matter.  After he leaves New York, Stella figures out the true culprit is her foster sister.  She locates the woman, who is living under an alias, and, while she does confront her, Stella does not immediately cuff her, but gives her a day to flee.  It is unknown how much she later reveals to Detective Valens (episode 322, "Cold Reveal").

Stella and her colleagues attempt to defend Mac Taylor on the stand after the senior CSI comes under fire for his supposed culpability in the death of kidnapper/murderer Clay Dobson.  She is forced to admit that Mac violated department procedures when he charged alone after Dobson. However, Stella later advises Mac to learn to play politics, as that is what the trumped-up charges are all about.  After Mac is cleared, she congratulates him on a game well-played, but agree that this is likely not the last time he will be put under the microscope (episode 323, "...Comes Around").

In episode 701, "The 34th Floor", it is revealed that Stella has moved to New Orleans and is head of their crime lab.

External links 
 Episode 322 "Cold Reveal" crossover with Cold Case

CSI: NY characters
Fictional European-American people
Fictional forensic scientists
Fictional Greek people in television
Fictional New York City Police Department detectives
Orphan characters in television
Television characters introduced in 2004